Hello, Baby! is a 2009 children's picture book by Mem Fox and illustrated by Steve Jenkins. In this book the narrator asks the reader whether they are various animals.

Reception
A review in Kirkus Reviews of Hello, Baby! wrote: "This picture book brims with fascinating animals, brilliant words and engaging artwork; it begs for cozy nightly readings". Booklist, comparing it to a previous Fox title, wrote: "As in her best-selling title Ten Little Fingers and Ten Little Toes (2008), a Booklist Editors' Choice selection, Fox creates an affectionate, singsong picture book directed straight at small children".

Hello, Baby! has also been reviewed by Publishers Weekly, School Library Journal, Horn Book Guides, Magpies, and Reading Time.

References

External links
 Library holdings of Hello, Baby!

Australian picture books
2009 children's books
Picture books by Mem Fox